Joseph Wilson Fifer (October 28, 1840 – August 6, 1938) was the 19th Governor of Illinois, serving from 1889 to 1893. He also served as a member of the Illinois Senate from 1881 to 1883.

"Private Joe" Fifer was born at Staunton, Virginia on October 28, 1840. At the age of 16, in 1856, he moved with his family to Danvers, Illinois and worked in his father's brickyard for several years.

Fifer enlisted as a Private in the 33rd Illinois Infantry at the start of the Civil War and was severely wounded at Jackson, Mississippi during General Grant's Vicksburg campaign. He refused a discharge and spent the rest of the war guarding a prison boat.

After the war, Fifer married Gertrude Lewis, and had three children. The oldest child died in infancy, leaving Herman and Florence. He studied law at Illinois Wesleyan University and became the tax collector at Danvers Township. He served as the City Attorney of Bloomington, Illinois and as a state's attorney as well.

In 1880, he was elected to the state senate where he served for seven years.  His name was elevated to state level after fighting with General John Black, the pension commissioner, when the latter tried to remove him as a "typical Republican politician who did not deserve a pension." Fifer's pension was $24 a month. Due to his celebrity status "Private Joe" Fifer was elected Governor of Illinois in 1889. One of his notable acts as Governor was to commute the life sentence of murderer Dr.Thomas Neill Cream, allowing his release, and freeing Cream to commit at least four more murders in London.
Fifer lost a reelection bid, and then twice refused the nomination to run again for governor. He was appointed to the Interstate Commerce Commission (ICC) by President William McKinley in 1899.

Governor Fifer lived to see his daughter, Florence Fifer Bohrer, elected as the first female State Senator of Illinois in 1924.

Notes

External links 
 
 bio squib at Illinois National Guard
 bio squib at Daily Pantagraph
 Joseph Fifer House (in Bloomington)
 Fifer-Bohrer Papers Collection - McLean County Museum of History archives

1840 births
1938 deaths
Republican Party governors of Illinois
Republican Party Illinois state senators
People from Bloomington, Illinois
Politicians from Staunton, Virginia
People of the Interstate Commerce Commission